This is a list of Estonian football transfers in the summer transfer window 2013 by club. Only transfers in Meistriliiga are included.

Meistriliiga

Flora

In:

Out:

Narva Trans

In: 

Out:

Levadia

In: 

Out:

Tammeka

In: 

Out:

Nõmme Kalju

In: 

Out:

Sillamäe Kalev

In: 

Out:

Kuressaare

In: 

Out:

Paide Linnameeskond

In: 

Out:

Tallinna Kalev

In: 

Out:

Infonet

In: 

Out:

See also 

 2013 Meistriliiga
 2013 Esiliiga
 2013 Esiliiga B

References

External links 
 Official site of the Estonian Football Association

E
transfers
2013